The 1st Myx Music Awards was held on June 6, 2006 at Onstage Greenbelt, Makati.

Nominees
Winners are in bold text.

Favorite Music Video
 "The Day You Said Goodnight" by Hale
 "Mang Jose" by Parokya Ni Edgar
 "You'll Be Safe Here" by Rivermaya
 "Gemini" by Spongecola
 "Hari Ng Sablay" by Sugarfree

Favorite Song
 "Hallelujah" by Bamboo
 "Stay" by Cueshé
 "The Day You Said Goodnight" by Hale
 "Pinoy Ako" by Orange and Lemons
 "Gemini" Sponge Cola

Favorite Artist

 Bamboo
 Cueshé
 Hale
 MYMP
 Nina

Favorite Male Artist

 Ogie Alcasid
 Christian Bautista
 Mark Bautista
 Jay R
 Erik Santos

Favorite Female Artist

 Barbie Almalbis
 Sarah Geronimo
 Rachelle Ann Go
 Kitchie Nadal
 Nina

Favorite Group

 Bamboo
 Cueshé
 Hale
 MYMP
 Orange and Lemons

Favorite Collaboration

 "Koro" by Greyhoundz feat. Francis Magalona and Gloc9
 "Say That You Love Me" by Jay R and Kyla
 "Burn" by Nina and Christian Bautista
 "Sweet" by South Border and Jinky Vidal
 "High" by The Speaks and Barbie Almalbis

Favorite Remake

 "I Need You" by Mark Bautista
 "Maling Akala" by Brownman Revival
 "I Wanna Know What Love Is" by Sarah Geronimo
 "Tell Me Where It Hurts" by MYMP
 "Love Moves in Mysterious Ways" by Nina

Favorite Rock Video

 "Hallelujah" by Bamboo
 "Mang Jose" by Parokya Ni Edgar
 "KLSP" by Sponge Cola
 "Hari Ng Sablay" by Sugarfree
 "Alert The Armory" by Urbandub

Favorite Mellow Video

 "Hello" by Ogie Alcasid
 "Love Can't Lie" by Sarah Geronimo
 "From The Start" by Rachelle Ann Go
 "I Know" by Yasmien Kurdi
 "I Will Never Leave You" by Erik Santos

Favorite Urban Video

 "Stay Real" by April
 "Tula" by Gloc9
 "Just The Way You Are" by Jay R
 "Tingnan Mo" by Pikaso
 "Sweet" by South Border and Jinky Vidal

Favorite Indie Artist

 Imago
 Radioactive Sago Project
 Sandwich
 Shiela and the Insects
 Twisted Halo

Favorite New Artist

 Brownman Revival
 Cueshé
 Hale
 Yasmien Kurdi
 Sponge Cola

Favorite MYX Live Performance

 Bamboo
 Brownman Revival
 MYMP
 Parokya Ni Edgar
 Raymond Lauchengco

Favorite International Music Video

 "We Belong Together" by Mariah Carey
 "My Humps" by The Black Eyed Peas
 "Don't Cha" by Pussycat Dolls
 "Incomplete" by Backstreet Boys
 "Wake Me Up When September Ends" by Green Day

Favorite Media Soundtrack
 "Just A Smile" by Barbie Almalbis (Close-up)
 "Pinoy Ako" by Orange and Lemons (Pinoy Big Brother)
 "First Day Funk" by Parokya Ni Edgar (Rexona)
 "You'll Be Safe Here" by Rivermaya (Spirits)
 "Makita Kang Muli" by Sugarfree (Panday)

Favorite Guest Appearance in a Music Video

 Uma Khouny for "What I Do Best" by Sheryn Regis
 Kris Aquino for "Hello" by Ogie Alcasid
 Joel Torre for "Hari Ng Sablay" by Sugarfree
 Anne Curtis for "I Need You" by Mark Bautista
 Precious Lara Quigaman for "Everything You Do by Christian Bautista

Special awards

Myx Magna Award
Sharon Cuneta

Reference

Philippine music awards